Jerry Kilgore can refer to:
Jerry Kilgore (politician) (born 1961), former Attorney General of Virginia
Jerry Kilgore (singer) (born 1964), country music artist